Roland Schröder (born 17 August 1962 in Köthen) is a retired German rower who won a gold medal at the 1988 Summer Olympics in Seoul. He also won medals at World Rowing Championships in 1989 and 1990.

References

Rowers at the 1988 Summer Olympics
Olympic rowers of East Germany
Olympic gold medalists for East Germany
1962 births
Living people
Olympic medalists in rowing
East German male rowers
Medalists at the 1988 Summer Olympics
World Rowing Championships medalists for East Germany
People from Köthen (Anhalt)
Sportspeople from Saxony-Anhalt